The Géotechnique lecture is an biennial lecture on the topic of soil mechanics, organised by the British Geotechnical Association named after its major scientific journal Géotechnique.

This should not be confused with the annual BGA Rankine Lecture.

List of Géotechnique Lecturers

See also

 Named lectures
 Rankine Lecture
 Terzaghi Lecture

External links
 ICE Géotechnique journal
 British Geotechnical Association

References

Civil engineering
Geotechnical conferences
Science lecture series